Then What may refer to:

 "Then What?", a 1998 song by Clay Walker
 "Then What" (Illy song), 2019